Brickell Bayview Center, also known as the Brickell City Tower, is a skyscraper in the Brickell financial district of Miami, Florida, USA, at 80 SW 8th Street. Completed in 1986, the floor-to-ceiling glass facade building once stood alone on the western side of Brickell, which at the time was home to mostly office towers and older low-rise residential buildings. After two residential high-rise building booms, the first in the 2000s, concurrent with the 2000s real estate bubble, and the second in the 2010s, the building was virtually surrounded by taller buildings. Solitair Brickell required demolishing a parking ramp to the base of the building to the northeast, Brickell Heights was built directly adjacent to the east, and Nine at Mary Brickell Village was built directly to the south of the building. To the west, even West Brickell saw significant mid-rise development in the 2010s, such as the West Brickell View low income senior housing two blocks to the west.

It is adjacent to the Brickell Metrorail and Metromover station. The building is also known as the Chase Building, naming rights for anchor tenant Chase Bank, which has a branch on the ground floor. It was once one of the tallest buildings in Miami, but by 2017 wouldn't even be in the top 100.

The  building was sold in 2013 for US$70 million. The building was sold again in October 2018 for $117.25 million to the real estate arm of New York Life Insurance Company.

Gallery

References

Skyscraper office buildings in Miami
Office buildings completed in 1986
1986 establishments in Florida